Alibaba Aur 40 Chor (Alibaba And 40 Thieves) is 1966 Hindi adventure fantasy film produced and directed by Homi Wadia and starring Sanjeev Kumar in the lead role. The film is based on Ali Baba's story from One Thousand and One Nights

Plot
Ali Baba finds a cave of treasures belonging to a gang of bandits. When the bandits realize there have been intruders, they seek revenge. Ali Baba must try to outwit who are trying leader of the 40 thieves who are trying to find and kill him.

Cast

 Sanjeev Kumar as Ali Baba
 L. Vijayalaxmi as Princess Marjina
 David as Baba Mustafa
 Indira as Mir Qasim's wife, Ali Baba's sister-in-law 
 Tabassum as Gulbadan
 Kamal Mehra as Aflatoon
 S. N. Tripathi as Mir Qasim
 B. M. Vyas as Daku Sardar
 Amarnath
 Veena as Razia, Ali Baba's elder sister
 Bhagawan Sinha
 Raj Rani
 Ramlal
 Yunus Pervez	
 Prince Arjun				
 Madhumati as Dancer
 Laxmi Chhaya as Qwali Dancer
 Aruna	
 Sukale
 Bismilla			
 Mithoo Miya			
 Samson
 Korega		
 Yadav
 Tun Tun

Soundtrack 
Usha Khanna composed the film's music while lyricists Asad Bhopali, Prem Dhawan and Javed Anwar penned the songs.

References

External links 
 

1966 films
1960s Hindi-language films
Films directed by Homi Wadia
Films based on Ali Baba